The following is a list of cruise missiles.

References

Cruise missile